Caledonia High School (CHS) was a public high school located in Caledonia, Ontario. Caledonia High School was built overlooking the Grand River in 1924. High school students before that were enrolled at the old Caledonia Public School, once located behind the Caledonia Presbyterian Church.

Caledonia High School's mascot was the "blue devil" and the school colors were blue and gold.

History

In 1877, four rooms were added to the public school to accommodate Caledonia's first high school students. This facility was such that it became a "Model School", where teachers received a diploma to teach for  a three-year period.

A movement started to have a new building, and though there was some opposition, a site on the south side of the river was chosen, with a beautiful view of the Grand River. Caledonia High School opened in 1924.

In September 1924, the Sachem said this: " The Caledonia Public School re-opened on Mon. Sept. 2 with an enrolment of over two hundred pupils. This will give each of the six rooms between thirty and forty pupils."

"The old high school will be occupied by the first book scholars with Miss Laird as teacher, the third with Miss Gordon and the fourth Mr. Ferguson. In what was formerly the Public School will be the Primary Class with Miss Hull, the Junior Second with Miss Taylor and the Senior Second and Junior Third with Miss M.B. Patterson. (And that makes six rooms) This re-arrangement will eliminate the overcrowding which has been such a detriment to the school for the past four years.

The original CHS building consisted of 3 floors with 8 classrooms was upgraded in the 1950s to have a "new wing". This consisted of 8 extra classrooms, and the library. The two sections where connected by the breezeway.

Grade nine students had half lockers in the old building, grade 12 and 13 students were assigned full lockers in the new wing, and anything left were made available to the grade 11 then grade 10 students.

The lyrics to Lynyrd Skynyrd's Sweet Home Alabama were changed to "Sweet Home Caledonia, where the Devils are Blue" during High School dances during Football Season. The Blue Devils were the football champions in the School year 1991/1992.

The entire student body was photographed from the roof of the school on the front lawn for the center of the yearbook.

The final graduating year consisted of 378 students with 67 Graduates, 74 in Grade 12, 87 in Grade 11, 72 in Grade 10 and 78 in Grade 9.

In May 1992, the students were allowed to write their final exams early to provide enough time for the renovations to be finished for September when the school would reopen as River Heights Elementary School. Also in September, McKinnon Park Secondary School became the new home of the Blue Devils.

References 

Defunct schools in Canada
Educational institutions established in 1924
High schools in Haldimand County
1924 establishments in Ontario
1992 disestablishments in Ontario
Educational institutions disestablished in 1992